Samuel Augustus Foot (November 8, 1780 – September 15, 1846; his surname is also spelled Foote) was the 28th Governor of Connecticut as well as a United States representative and Senator.

Biography
Born November 8, 1780 in Cheshire, Connecticut, to John & Abigail (Hall) Foot. Having entered Yale College at the age of thirteen, was the youngest student in the graduating class of 1797. He attended the Litchfield Law School when he was seventeen, but discontinued law studies due to ill health. He then moved to New Haven, Connecticut; became a West India Trader and made many voyages for his health.  He married Eudocia Hull in 1803 and they had seven children (the second of whom was Andrew Hull Foote).

Career
When the War of 1812 Embargo Act ruined his business, Foot returned to his father's farm in Cheshire in 1813, engaged in agricultural pursuits and politics.

Foot was a member of the Connecticut House of Representatives in 1817 and 1818, and was elected to the Sixteenth Congress, serving from March 4, 1819 to March 3, 1821. He was again a member of the State house of representatives from 1821 to 1823 and 1825 to 1826, serving as speaker in 1825 to 1826; he was elected to the Eighteenth Congress, serving from March 4, 1823 to March 3, 1825.  He was elected by the General Assembly to the U.S. Senate as an Adams' man (later Anti-Jacksonian) within the splintering Democratic Republican Party.  He served in the Senate from March 4, 1827 to March 3, 1833.  In the Senate he is most noted for the "Foot Resolution" of December 29, 1829 to limit the sale of public lands. It was during debate on this resolution that Daniel Webster gave his "Liberty and Union, one and inseparable, now and forever" speech.

Foot was an unsuccessful candidate for reelection in 1832; while in the United States Congress, he was chairman of the Committee on Pensions (Twenty-first and Twenty-second Congresses). He was elected to the Twenty-third Congress, and served from March 4, 1833, to May 9, 1834,  when he resigned to become Governor of Connecticut, a position he held in 1834 and 1835. He was an unsuccessful Whig candidate for re-election in 1835.  Foot later served as a presidential elector on the Clay-Frelinghuysen ticket in 1844.

Death
Foot died in Cheshire on September 15, 1846. He is interred at Hillside Cemetery, Cheshire, Connecticut.

References

External links

Litchfield Historical Society
National Governors Association
The Political Graveyard
Govtrack US Congress
 

1780 births
1846 deaths
People from Cheshire, Connecticut
Foote family
Democratic-Republican Party members of the United States House of Representatives from Connecticut
National Republican Party United States senators from Connecticut
National Republican Party members of the United States House of Representatives from Connecticut
Connecticut Whigs
Governors of Connecticut
Whig Party state governors of the United States
Members of the Connecticut House of Representatives
Yale College alumni
Litchfield Law School alumni